Alberto Croce (born 5 May 1944) is an Italian professional golfer who won twice on the European Seniors Tour.

Professional wins (8)

Other wins (6)
1972 Rome Aloyco Tournament
1976 Memorial Olivier Barras
1978 Italian PGA Championship
1979 Italian PGA Championship
1980 Memorial Olivier Barras
1981 Italian PGA Championship

European Senior Tour wins (2)

European Senior Tour playoff record (1–0)

Team appearances
Amateur
St Andrews Trophy (representing the Continent of Europe): 1964, 1966

Professional
World Cup (representing Italy): 1972, 1973
Marlboro Nations' Cup/Philip Morris International (representing Italy): 1973, 1975

External links

Italian male golfers
European Senior Tour golfers
1944 births
Living people